Joe Anderson (born 24 December 1988) is an Indigenous Australian rules footballer who played for the Carlton Football Club in the Australian Football League (AFL).

Born in Darwin, Northern Territory, Anderson is a fast and durable rebounding defender and occasional midfielder who captained the Northern Territory at Under-18 level and was best and fairest for Northern Territory Football League (NTFL) club Darwin. 

Anderson was selected in the 2006 AFL National Draft by Carlton with their fifth round selection (67th overall pick) and made his AFL debut in Carlton's 2007 Round 4 clash against the West Coast Eagles at Subiaco. Throughout his AFL career, Anderson struggled to hold a regular position, playing twelve games overall, and spending most of his time developing with Carlton's , the Northern Bullants. Anderson was a member of the Bullants' losing 2009 grand final team, and played his 50th game for the VFL club in 2010. He was de-listed by Carlton at the end of the 2010 AFL season.

Anderson moved to South Australia after being delisted, where he played more than 100 games in the South Australian National Football League. He played for Sturt from 2011 until 2012, then moved to North Adelaide in 2013, initially retiring due to injury in 2016, before making a return in 2017. He also played for his former junior team, Darwin, during many of the summer seasons while in the SANFL.

His younger brother Jed, was recruited to  during off season trading in October 2012.

References

External links

1988 births
Living people
Carlton Football Club players
Indigenous Australian players of Australian rules football
Sportspeople from Darwin, Northern Territory
Sturt Football Club players
North Adelaide Football Club players
Preston Football Club (VFA) players
Darwin Football Club players
Australian rules footballers from the Northern Territory
Northern Territory Football Club players